Heidi Jauk is an Austrian para-alpine skier. She represented Austria at the 1976 Winter Paralympics and at the 1980 Winter Paralympics and in total she won four silver medals.

Achievements

See also 

 List of Paralympic medalists in alpine skiing

References 

Living people
Year of birth missing (living people)
Place of birth missing (living people)
Paralympic alpine skiers of Austria
Alpine skiers at the 1976 Winter Paralympics
Alpine skiers at the 1980 Winter Paralympics
Medalists at the 1976 Winter Paralympics
Medalists at the 1980 Winter Paralympics
Paralympic silver medalists for Austria
Paralympic medalists in alpine skiing
Austrian female alpine skiers
20th-century Austrian people